The NBA's Lifetime Achievement Award is an annual National Basketball Association (NBA) award given to a player who exemplified extraordinary success on and off the court in the NBA.

The inaugural recipient of the award was Bill Russell: a Presidential Medal of Freedom recipient, Naismith Memorial Basketball Hall of Famer and 11-time NBA Champion with the Boston Celtics.  The 2019 award was shared between two players: Larry Bird and Magic Johnson.  Every recipient of the award has been elected to the Naismith Memorial Basketball Hall of Fame prior to receiving the award.  , all winners have been American.

Winners

See also

 List of National Basketball Association awards
 List of lifetime achievement awards

References

Lifetime Achievement Award
National Basketball Association lists
Awards established in 2017
Lifetime achievement awards